Azad Kooh is one of the highest peaks in the central Alburz Range in Mazandaran province north of Iran. In Persian Kooh means mountain and Azad means free, so Azad Kooh can be translated to The Free Mountain. This name is probably chosen by local people because of Azad Kooh's cone like shape and the fact that it is not connected to its surrounding peaks.

Climbing Azad Kooh 

Azad kooh is not a technical climb and you won't need any technical gear to climb the mountain in summer. There are two routes for climbing this peak, the easier and shorter one is from Kalaak-e-Baalaa village and the longer one is from Vaarange Rud village. The former takes 1–2 days and the latter 2–4 days. There is no shelter on either route and you need to carry your own tent if you are planning to camp. Azad Kooh is not such an easy climb in the winter, there will be a considerable amount of snow and the potential danger of avalanche in either route.

References

Mountaineering in Iran
Mountains of Mazandaran Province
Four-thousanders of the Alborz